

Regular season

Play-by-play
John Wells: 1986 NHL All-Star Game, occasional games until 1989
Jim Hughson: 1987–1994 (lead play-by-play announcer)
Paul Romanuk: 1989–1994 (secondary play-by-play announcer), 1995 –1998 (lead play-by-play announcer)
Gord Miller: 1990–1995 (occasional games) , 2002–present (lead play-by-play – Toronto Maple Leafs and Ottawa Senators play-by-play announcer since 2014)
Dan Shulman: 1995–1997 (secondary play-by-play announcer)
Pierre Houde: 1996–1997
Dennis Beyak: 1997–1998 (secondary play-by-play announcer), 2011–2022 (Winnipeg Jets play-by-play announcer)
Vic Rauter: 2002–2003
Dave Randorf: 2002–2014; 2010–2014 (Montreal Canadiens play-by-play announcer)
Chris Cuthbert: 2005–2020 (secondary play-by-play announcer; 2014–2020 Toronto Maple Leafs and Ottawa Senators play-by-play announcer)
Rod Black: 2003–2004, 2008
Bryan Mudryk: 2018–present (Montreal Canadiens play-by-play announcer)

Colour commentator
Howie Meeker: 1986 NHL All-Star Game 
Roger Neilson: 1987–1989
Gary Green: 1987–1998 (lead colour commentator), 2002–2004 (secondary colour commentator)
Pierre McGuire: 2002–2011 (lead colour commentator)
Ryan Walter: 1993–1998 (secondary colour commentator)
Randy Gregg: 1995 playoffs
Glenn Healy: 2003 playoffs, 2005–2008 (secondary colour commentator)
Ray Ferraro: 2008–2011 (secondary colour commentator), 2011–2022 (lead colour commentator – Toronto Maple Leafs/Ottawa Senators since 2014)
Dave Reid: 2008–2010 (secondary colour commentator), 2010–2014 (Montreal Canadiens colour commentator)
Mike Johnson: 2010–2014 (secondary color commentator), 2017–present (rotating Montreal Canadiens colour commentator), 2022–present (lead colour commentator – Toronto Maple Leafs/Ottawa Senators since 2022)
Jamie McLennan: 2011–present (secondary color commentator – Toronto Maple Leafs/Ottawa Senators since 2014)
Brian Engblom: 2011–2015 (Winnipeg Jets secondary color commentator)
Shane Hnidy: 2011–2017 (Winnipeg Jets secondary color commentator)
Dave Poulin: 2017–present (rotating Montreal Canadiens colour commentator)
Craig Button: 2017–present (rotating Montreal Canadiens colour commentator)

Studio host
Jim Van Horne: 1986 NHL All-Star Game, 1987–1994
John Wells: 1989–1995
Paul Romanuk: 1987–1989, 1995–1998 (Secondary)
Gord Miller: 1995–1998 (Primary)
James Duthie: 2002–present (Primary)
Darren Dutchyshen: 2014–present (Secondary)

Studio analyst
Bob McKenzie: 1986 NHL All-Star Game, 1987–present
Howie Meeker: 1987–1998
Bill Watters: 1987–1989
Mike Keenan: 1992–1993
Glenn Healy: 2003–2008
Darren Pang: 2006–2014
Mike Milbury: 2007–2008
John Tortorella: 2007–2009
Matthew Barnaby: 2007–2016
Barry Melrose: 2009–present
Ray Ferraro: 2008–2022
Craig MacTavish: 2009–2011
Mike Johnson: 2010–2014
Michael Peca: 2010–2012
Aaron Ward: 2010–2016
Marc Crawford: 2011–2012
Jeff O'Neill: 2011–present

Rinkside reporters
Michael Whalen: 1987–2007 (Montreal Canadiens games)
Ken Chilibeck: 1987–2004 (Edmonton Oilers games)
Teresa Hergert: 1987–1990 (Calgary Flames games)
Lisa Bowes: 1994–1997 (Calgary Flames games)
Mark Bunting: 1994–1996 (Winnipeg Jets I games)
Farhan Lalji: 1997–present (Vancouver Canucks games)
Brent Wallace: 2002–2020 (Ottawa Senators games)
Dave Randorf: 2002–2010 (Toronto Maple Leafs games)
John Lu: 2002–2007 (Toronto Maple Leafs games), 2007–2014, 2018–2022 (Montreal Canadiens games), 2022-present (Winnipeg Jets games)
Ryan Rishaug: 2005–present (Edmonton Oilers or Calgary Flames games)
Holly Horton: 2005–2011 (Toronto Maple Leafs games)
James Cybulski: 2006–2012 (Toronto Maple Leafs games)
Sara Orlesky: 2007–2011 (Toronto Maple Leafs games), 2011–2022 (Winnipeg Jets games)
Katherine Dolan: 2009–2014 (Toronto Maple Leafs games)

NHL insiders
Bob McKenzie: 1987–present
Darren Dreger: 2006–present
Pierre LeBrun: 2011–present
Craig Button: 2012–present

Stanley Cup playoffs
During the playoffs, TSN has third, fifth, seventh, and eighth choices of first-round series, second and fourth in the second round, and second in the conference finals.  This means that there is the possibility of TSN covering a Canadian team during the playoffs. This happened during the 2009 Stanley Cup playoffs, as TSN televised the Calgary Flames' first-round series against the Chicago Blackhawks, but Calgary lost in six games and in the 2010 Stanley Cup playoffs when the Montreal Canadiens defeated the Washington Capitals in seven games, and the 2013 Stanley Cup playoffs when the Vancouver Canucks lost in four straight games to the San Jose Sharks.

Notes
1988 – TSN aired the Edmonton-Winnipeg playoff series nationally under the Carling O'Keefe banner, except for Edmonton and Winnipeg markets where CBC retained exclusive rights through Molson exclusivity.
1998 – Due to the television premiere of the film Apollo 13, Game 3 of the Colorado-Edmonton playoff series was seen on both CBC and TSN, using CBC's feed. CBC's end of the deal was regionally televised in Western Canada, while TSN broadcast the game in Eastern Canada.
2003 – Game 2 of the New Jersey–Boston was not televised as TSN instead, aired the World Curling Championships from Winnipeg. 
Game 3 of the Detroit-Anaheim series was joined-in-progress after the completion of WWE Raw. Likewise, Game 6 of the Dallas-Anaheim series was joined-in-progress after the completion of WWE Raw.

Notes
1. Jim Hughson left TSN during the 1994–95 NHL lockout. When the season resumed, Paul Romanuk succeeded Hughson as TSN's lead play-by-play announcer and Dan Shulman succeeded Romanuk as the network's secondary announcer.
2. In 1993, Gord Miller filled in for Jim Hughson after his father died.

References

NHL on TSN commentating crews
TSN commentating crews